Ajmer-Merwara (also known as Ajmir Province, and Ajmer-Merwara-Kekri) was a former province of British India in the historical Ajmer region. The territory was ceded to the British by Daulat Rao Sindhia by a treaty on 25 June 1818. 
It was under the Bengal Presidency until 1836 when it became part of the North-Western Provinces. Finally on 1 April 1871, it became a separate province as Ajmer-Merwara-Kekri. 
It became a part of independent India on 15 August 1947 when the British left India.

The province consisted of the districts of Ajmer and Merwar, which were physically separated from the rest of British India forming an enclave amidst the many princely states of Rajputana. Unlike these states, which were ruled by local nobles who acknowledged British suzerainty, Ajmer-Merwara was administered directly by the British.

In 1842, the two districts were under a single commissioner, then they were separated in 1856 and were administered by the East India Company. Finally, after 1858, by a chief commissioner who was subordinate to the Governor-General of India's agent for the Rajputana Agency.

Extent and geography
The plateau, on whose centre stands the town of Ajmer, may be considered as the highest point in the plains of North India; from the circle of hills which hem it in, the country slopes away on every side - towards river valleys on the east, south, west and towards the Thar Desert region on the north. The Aravalli Range is the distinguishing feature of the district. The range of hills which runs between Ajmer and Nasirabad marks the watershed of the continent of India. The rain which falls on the southeastern slopes drains into the Chambal, and so into the Bay of Bengal; that which falls on the northwest side into the Luni River, which discharges itself into the Rann of Kutch.

The province is on the border of what may be called the arid zone; it is the debatable land between the north-eastern and south-western monsoons, and beyond the influence of either. The south-west monsoon sweeps up the Narmada valley from Bombay and crossing the tableland at Neemuch gives copious supplies to Malwa, Jhalawar and Kota and the countries which lie in the course of the Chambal River.

The clouds which strike Kathiawar and Kutch are deprived of a great deal of their moisture by the hills in those countries (now the majority of this region is in Gujarat state within independent India), and the greater part of the remainder is deposited on Mount Abu and the higher slopes of the Aravalli Range, leaving but little for Merwara, where the hills are lower, and still less for Ajmer. It is only when the monsoon is in considerable force that Merwara gets a plentiful supply from it. The north-eastern monsoon sweeps up the valley of the Ganges from the Bay of Bengal and waters the northern part of Rajasthan, but hardly penetrates farther west than the longitude of Ajmer. The rainfall of the district depends on the varying strength of these two monsoons. The agriculturist of Ajmer-Merwara could never rely upon two good harvests in succession.

British rule
Part of the Ajmer region, the territory of the future province was ceded to the British by Daulat Rao Sindhia of Gwalior State as part of a treaty dated 25 June 1818. Then in May 1823 the Merwara (Mewar) part was ceded to Britain by Udaipur State. Thereafter Ajmer-Merwara was administered directly by the British East India Company. After the Indian Mutiny of 1857, in 1858 the powers of the company were transferred to the British Crown and the Governor-General of India. His administration of Ajmer-Merwara was controlled by a chief commissioner who was subordinate to the British agent for the Rajputana Agency.

Superintendents for Ajmer 
 9 Jul 181817 Jul 1818  Nixon
18 Jul 181815 Dec 1824  Francis Boyle Shannon Wilder       (1785–1849) 
16 Dec 182421 Apr 1825  Richard Moore (1st time)
22 Apr 182523 Oct 1827  Henry Middleton
24 Oct 182728 Nov 1831  Richard Cavendish
29 Nov 18311 Jul 1832  Richard Moore (2nd time)
 2 Jul 183216 Apr 1834  Alexander Speirs
17 Apr 183430 Jun 1836  George Frederick Edmonstone        (1813–1864)
 1 Jul 183625 Jul 1837  Charles E. Trevelyan               (1807–1886)
26 Jul 1837Feb 1842     J.D. Macnaghten

Superintendents for Merwara (from Feb 1842, Ajmer-Merwara)
18231836                Henry Hall                         (1789–1875)
18361857                Charles George Dixon               (died 1857)

Agents of the Governors-general for the Rajputana agency 
183229 Nov 1833         Abraham Lockett                    (1781–1834)
29 Nov 1833Jun 1834     Alexander Speirs
Jun 18341 Feb 1839     Nathaniel Alves  
 1 Feb 18391839         John Ludlow (acting)               (1788–1880)
Apr 1839Dec 1847        James Sutherland                   (died 1848)         
Jan 1844Oct 1846        Charles Thoresby                   (died 1862) (acting for Sutherland)
Dec 1847Jan 1853        John Low                           (1788–1880)
25 Jun 184819 Nov 1848  Showers (acting for Low)
 8 Sep 18511 Dec 1851  D.A. Malcolm (acting for Low)
18521853                George St. Patrick Lawrence        (1804–1884) (1st time)  
 5 Mar 1853Feb 1857     Henry Montgomery Lawrence          (1806–1857) 
15 Mar 1857Apr 1864     George St. Patrick Lawrence        (s.a.)  (2nd time) 
10 Apr 185924 Nov 1860  William Frederick Eden             (1814–1867) (acting for Lawrence)
Apr 18641867            William Frederick Eden             (s.a.) 
18671870                Richard Harte Keatinge             (1825–1904) 
15 Jun 18701 Apr 1871  John Cheap Brooke                  (1818–1899) (acting for Keatinge)

Chief Commissioners

 1 Apr 187121 Jun 1873  Richard Harte Keatinge             (s.a.) 
 1 Apr 187121 Jun 1873  John Cheape Brooke                 (s.a.)  (acting for Keatinge)
21 Jun 18736 Apr 1874  Sir Lewis Pelly (1st time)         (1825–1892)  (acting to 6 Feb 1874)
 6 Apr 18746 Jul 1874  William H. Beynon (acting)         (1903)
 6 Jul 187412 Nov 1874  Sir Lewis Pelly (2nd time)         (s.a.)  
12 Nov 187418 Aug 1876  Alfred Comyns Lyall (acting)       (1835–1911) 
18 Aug 18765 Mar 1877  Charles Kenneth Mackenzie Walter   (1833–1892)  (1st time)(acting)
 5 Mar 187712 Dec 1878  Sir Lewis Pelly (3rd time)         (s.a.)  
12 Dec 187827 Mar 1887  Edward Ridley Colborne Bradford    (1836–1911)  (1st time)
17 Mar 188128 Nov 1882  Charles Kenneth Mackenzie Walter   (s.a.)  (2nd time) (acting)
28 Nov 188227 Mar 1887  Edward Ridley Colborne Bradford    (s.a.) (2nd time)
27 Mar 188720 Mar 1890  Charles Kenneth Mackenzie Walter   (1833–1892) (3rd time)(acting to 1 Apr 1887)
20 Mar 189027 Aug 1891  George Herbert Trevor (1st time)   (1840–1927) 
27 Aug 18912 Dec 1891  P.W. Powlett (acting)
 2 Dec 189122 Nov 1893  George Herbert Trevor (2nd time)   (s.a.)        
22 Nov 189311 Jan 1894  William Francis Prideaux (acting)  (1840–1914)
11 Jan 189520 Mar 1895  George Herbert Trevor (3rd time)   (s.a.)    
20 Mar 189510 Mar 1898  Robert Joseph Crosthwaite          (1841–1917) 
10 Mar 18981 May 1900  Arthur Henry Temple Martindale     (1854–1942) (1st time)
 1 May 19001 Apr 1901  William Hutt Curzon Wyllie (acting)(1848–1909)
 1 Apr 19013 Feb 1902  A.P. Thornton (acting)
 3 Feb 19021 Apr 1905  Arthur Henry Temple Martindale     (s.a.) (2nd time)     
 1 Apr 19054 Jan 1918  Elliot Graham Colvin               (1861–1940) 
 4 Jan 191822 Dec 1919  John Manners Smith                 (1864–1920) 
22 Dec 19197 Aug 1925  Robert Erskine Holland             (1873–1965) 
 7 Aug 192518 Mar 1927  Stewart Blakeley Agnew Patterson   (1872–1942) 
18 Mar 192714 Oct 1932  Leonard William Reynolds           (1874–1946) 
14 Oct 193228 Oct 1937  George Drummond Ogilvie            (1882–1966) 
28 Oct 19371 Dec 1944  Arthur Cunningham Lothian          (1887–1962) 
May 1939Oct 1939        Conrad Corfield                    (1893–1980) (acting for Lothian)
 1 Dec 194415 Aug 1947  Hiranand Rupchand Shivdasani       (1904–1949)

Post-independence
From the date of partition and independence in 1947 until 1950, Ajmer-Merwara remained a province of the new Dominion of India. In 1950 it became Ajmer State, which on 1 November 1956, was merged into the state of Rajasthan.

The Rajasthan Land Reforms and Resumption of Jagirs Act, 1952 was the landmark in the legal history of land reforms in Rajasthan which was followed by Rajasthan Tenancy Act, 1955 that became applicable to the whole of Rajasthan. The overriding effect of this Act provided relief to the existing tenants and the rights accrued to tenants accordingly. Now the Jats are major land holders in the region.

See also
Rawat Rajputs
The Mer (community) are a Hindu caste from the Gujarat and Central India who emigrated hundred of years ago from Ajmer-Merwara and the surrounding regions of Rajputana.
Mair Rajputs of Punjab are a Hindu caste who emigrated hundreds of years ago to Punjab from Ajmer-Merwara and the surrounding regions of Rajputana.

References

Provinces of British India
Historical Indian regions
History of Rajasthan
Ajmer district
1818 establishments in British India
1936 disestablishments in British India
History of Ajmer